Events from the year 1765 in Ireland.

Incumbent
Monarch: George III

Events
Coercion Act against the Whiteboys.
First Magdalene asylum (for Protestant girls) in Ireland opens on Leeson Street in Dublin, founded by Lady Arabella Denny.
Gracehill established in County Antrim as a Moravian community.

Arts and literature
Sculptor Christopher Hewetson settles in Rome.

Births
14 January – George Knox, politician (died 1827).
13 April – Thomas Wallace, politician (died 1847).
19 July – George Beresford, Church of Ireland Bishop of Kilmore (died 1841).
6 December – Edward O'Reilly, scholar (died 1830).
29 December - Laurence Hynes Halloran, alleged criminal deported to Australia
Robert Holmes, barrister and nationalist (died 1859).
Samuel Turner, barrister and informer (killed 1807).
Approximate date – Charles Bourke, priest (died 1820).

Deaths
24 November – William Dunkin, poet (born c.1709).
26 November – Sir Edward O'Brien, 2nd Baronet, politician (born 1705).
29 December – John Alexander, minister and writer (born 1736).
31 December – Samuel Madden, clergyman, writer and benefactor (born 1686).

References

 
Years of the 18th century in Ireland
Ireland
1760s in Ireland